Hans Dorfner (born 3 July 1965) is a German former footballer

Career 
Dorfner played as a midfielder for Bayern Munich and 1. FC Nürnberg in the (West) German top-flight. He won seven caps for West Germany in the late 1980s, and went to UEFA Euro 1988 as an unused squad member. His career was cut short by injury after the 1993/94 season.

Honours

Club 
Bayern Munich
 DFB-Pokal: 1983–84
 Bundesliga: 1986–87, 1988–89, 1989–90
 DFL-Supercup: 1987

1. FC Nürnberg
 2. Bundesliga: 1984–85

References

External links 
 
 
 

1965 births
Living people
German footballers
Association football midfielders
Germany international footballers
Germany under-21 international footballers
Germany youth international footballers
FC Bayern Munich footballers
FC Bayern Munich II players
1. FC Nürnberg players
UEFA Euro 1988 players
Bundesliga players
2. Bundesliga players